Merrifieldia probolias is a moth of the family Pterophoridae that is found in Tunisia.

References

Moths described in 1891
probolias
Endemic fauna of Tunisia
Moths of Africa